The Argentina men's national under-19 volleyball team represents Argentina in men's under-19 volleyball events, it is controlled and managed by the Argentinian Volleyball federation that is a member of South American volleyball body Confederación Sudamericana de Voleibol (CSV) and the international volleyball body government the Fédération Internationale de Volleyball (FIVB).

Results

Summer Youth Olympics
 Champions   Runners up   Third place   Fourth place

FIVB U19 World Championship
 Champions   Runners up   Third place   Fourth place

South America U19 Championship
 Champions   Runners up   Third place   Fourth place

Pan-American U19 Cup
 Champions   Runners up   Third place   Fourth place

Team

Current squad

The following is the Argentinean roster in the 2015 FIVB Volleyball Boys' U19 World Championship.

Head Coach: Luis Testa

References

External links
www.feva.org.ar 

Volleyball
National men's under-19 volleyball teams
Volleyball in Argentina